The 1992 Currie Cup / Central Series was a rugby union competition held between the teams in the 1992 Currie Cup and 1992 Currie Cup Central A competitions, the top two tiers of the premier domestic competition in South Africa. This formed part of the 54th Currie Cup season since the competition started in 1889.

Teams

Changes between 1991 and 1992 seasons
 Following the merger of all rugby governing bodies in South Africa,  were dissolved and  replaced them in the Currie Cup Central A.

Changes between 1992 and 1993 seasons
 None

Competition

There were ten participating teams in the 1992 Currie Cup / Central Series, the six teams from the 1992 Currie Cup and the four teams from the 1992 Currie Cup Central A. These teams played the teams from the other league once over the course of the season, either at home or away. Teams received two points for a win and one points for a draw.

The Currie Cup team with the best record would win the Percy Frames Trophy, the Central A team with the best record would win the W.V. Simkins Trophy.

For the 1992 Currie Cup / Central A series, SARU introduced a handicap system, where the Currie Cup Central A sides would get a points head-start in each game. The handicaps were as follows:

Log

Fixtures and results

Round one

Round two

Round three

Round four

Round five

Round six

Round seven

Round eight

Round nine

Round ten

Round eleven

See also
 1992 Currie Cup
 1992 Currie Cup Central A
 1992 Currie Cup Central B
 1992 Currie Cup Central / Rural Series
 1992 Currie Cup Rural A & B
 1992 Currie Cup Rural B
 1992 Lion Cup

References

1992
1992 Currie Cup